Simone Thomalla (born 11 April 1965) is a German actress.

Career 
As a child, Thomalla wanted to be a musician, but instead attended the Hochschule für Schauspielkunst Ernst Busch acting school in Berlin. She began her career in 1982 in East Germany, with the movie Abgefunden. Since then, she has had many roles in a variety of German movies and TV series. Thomalla is well known for appearing in commercials. She won the Goldene Kamera together with Rudi Assauer for her Veltins commercial. She currently plays detective Eva Saalfeld in the German TV series Tatort, as well as other roles. Playboy Germany published photos of Thomalla in their February 2010 edition.

Personal life
Thomalla is the daughter of architect Alfred Thomalla. She grew up in Potsdam, East Germany.

From 1991 to 1995, Thomalla was married to actor André Vetters. From 2000 to 2009, she was in a relationship with German football manager Rudi Assauer. Since 2009, she has been in a relationship with handball player Silvio Heinevetter. She gave birth to her daughter Sophia Thomalla during the East German revolution of 1989.

References

External links 

German film actresses
Living people
1965 births
Ernst Busch Academy of Dramatic Arts alumni
German television actresses
Actors from Leipzig
20th-century German actresses
21st-century German actresses
People from Potsdam